Aleksandr Vladislavovich Yarkin (born 29 December 1986) is a Russian former professional footballer.

Club career
He made his debut in Russian Premier League in 2006 for FC Rubin Kazan. He played for FC Rubin Kazan in UEFA Cup 2006–07 (1 game) and UEFA Intertoto Cup 2007 (2 games).

Personal life
His father Vladislav Yarkin, his uncle Aleksandr and his younger brother Artyom Yarkin are all professional footballers.

References

Russian footballers
Russia under-21 international footballers
Sportspeople from Barnaul
FC Dynamo Barnaul players
FC Rubin Kazan players
FC Spartak Vladikavkaz players
FC Krasnodar players
1986 births
Living people
Russian Premier League players
FC SKA-Khabarovsk players
FC Salyut Belgorod players
FC Sakhalin Yuzhno-Sakhalinsk players
Association football forwards
FC Novokuznetsk players
FC Chita players